is a subway station in Kōtō, Tokyo, Japan, operated by Toei Subway. Its station numbers are S-11 (Shinjuku Line) and E-13 (Ōedo Line).

Lines
Morishita Station is served by the following two lines.
 Toei Shinjuku Line
 Toei Ōedo Line

Platforms
Morishita Station consists of two island platforms (one for each line), each served by two tracks.

History
The station opened on December 21, 1978; service on the Ōedo Line began on December 12, 2000.

Surrounding area
The station is located underneath the intersection of Tokyo Metropolitan Routes 50 (Shin-Ōhashi-dōri) and 463 (Kiyosumi-dōri). The area is typically shitamachi, with a mix of mid-rise office buildings, apartment buildings, and homes. Being close to Ryōgoku, many sumōbeya are located in the vicinity.

Connecting bus service
Toei Bus: Morishita-Ekimae
 Mon 33: for Kameido Station
 Kyūkō 06: for National Museum of Emerging Science and Innovation
 Kin 11: for Kinshichō Station, Shinozaki Station

References

External links

 Tokyo Metropolitan Bureau of Transportation: Morishita Station (Shinjuku Line) 
 Tokyo Metropolitan Bureau of Transportation: Morishita Station (Ōedo Line) 

Railway stations in Tokyo
Railway stations in Japan opened in 1978